Rupert Clarke may refer to:
Rupee (musician), Barbadian reggae musician, born Rupert Clarke
one of three Australian Clarke baronets of Rupertswood, all named Rupert Clarke
Sir Rupert Clarke, 2nd Baronet (1865–1926)
Sir Rupert Clarke, 3rd Baronet (1919–2005)
Sir Rupert Clarke, 4th Baronet (1947-)